Ovo is a touring circus production by Cirque du Soleil that premiered in Montréal, Canada in 2009. Ovos creator and director, Deborah Colker, took inspiration from the world of insects. The idea for Ovo was not to be about the acts, nor dancing, nor insects, but about movement. The movement of life permeates the entire show, with creatures flying, leaping, bounding, and crawling.  Composer Berna Ceppas brought additional life to Ovo with a score inspired by the music of Brazil.  Ovo means "egg" in Portuguese and represents the underlying thread of the show.  Graphically, inside the logo of Ovo, is an insect. The two O's represent the eyes and the V forms the nose and antennas.

Set and technical information
The stage and set for Ovo were designed by Gringo Cardia and utilize irregular shapes throughout. During its arena tour, Ovo used the stage from the Cirque show Dralion. Inset in the wall are 24 "firefly eggs". These are molded fibreglass bulbs fitted with LED bulbs that can produce a full color spectrum of light.

Ovo has the largest flying act yet undertaken by Cirque du Soleil, as of 2010. To support it, eighty cables have to be installed during the performance. This requires the assistance of upwards of forty performers and technicians.

Cast
The cast of Ovo consists of three principal characters and numerous others in supporting roles. At its premiere, the makeup of Ovo included 54 performing artists from sixteen different countries.
 Master Flipo: The principal character, he keeps everything in this chaotic world in order.
 Foreigner: The Foreigner, another principal character, is a fly from a faraway land who brings with him the mysterious ovo.
 Ladybug: Ladybug is the third principal, who brings life and joy to the world of insects and also ends up falling for the Foreigner.
 Dragonfly: The dragonfly flits throughout the entire performance and performs the hand-balancing act.
 Spiders: Four spiders provide mystery and caution throughout the show. Their acts include contortion and slackwire.
 Fleas: Three spry fleas jump about with flashes of red and yellow as they perform acro-trio.
 Ants: The ants carry kiwi and corn with them on their journey as they perform foot juggling.
 Butterflies: The butterfly duo flies through the air in a Spanish web (2009–2015)/ aerial straps (2016–present).
 Firefly: The firefly flits about, performing with diabolos.
 Mosquito: The mosquito adds character to the performance, while also being part of the powertrack, trampoline, and wall act.
 Scarabs: The strong scarabs fly through the air, twisting and spinning in the flying trapeze (2009–2015)/ aerial cradle (2016–present).
 Crickets: Ten crickets jump and leap about in green streaks as they do air track, trampoline, and wall.
 Creatura: A mysterious Creatura brings life to the party with his dancing.
 Cockroaches: Nine cockroaches are seen singing and playing music throughout the entire performance.

Acts
Ovo has ten acrobatic acts, whereas the rest are dancing or supplemental to the storyline.
 Opening: The exciting and hectic world is portrayed by pounding samba music and bright lights, then a sudden calm—the bright lights change to warm natural light and the heavy samba is replaced by a calming guitar song.
 Foot-juggling and Icarian games (Ants): A group of ants juggle kiwis, corn, eggplant slices, as well as other ants, all on their feet.
 Hand balancing (Dragonfly): A lone dragonfly balances precariously on a high, rotating block.
 Tissue (Cocoon): Combining agility and grace, this soon-to-be butterfly performs a solo contortion on aerial silks, showcasing her theatrical metamorphosis.
 Duo straps (Butterflies): Two butterflies soar across the stage, strung on straps from the ceiling.
 Diabolos (Firefly): A firefly manipulates and tosses multiple diabolos at a time.
 Creatura (Creatura): A comic routine involving a giant suit that resembles multiple slinkys.
 Russian cradle (Scarabs): Based on Corteo's "Paradise" act, three aerial cradles are spaced diagonally above the stage, and fliers are thrown and caught in the arms of catchers in the cradles.
 Web (Spiders): One spider uses the same vertical rope as used by the butterflies to create multiple flexible poses, while another on the ground uses handstands to balance while her back and legs contort in multiple positions.
 Acro trio (Fleas): Two male performers use techniques similar to those in acrobatic gymnastics (acrosport) to toss a female performer in the air.
 Slackwire (Spider): On a loose (and sometimes swinging) wire, a spider balances with its legs and hands, and at one point rides a unicycle.
 "Legs": A unique dance, multiple legs pop up through holes in the stage.
 Wall (Crickets): The crickets bounce on a long trampoline in the floor called a power track; they perform tumbling at an amazing speed. A trampoline is also used by the crickets to jump onto the wall. On the wall, they leap off and land on the trampoline.
 Banquete: The finale of the show.

Acts in rotation
 Aerial hoop (Mosquito): Two artists fly over the stage on a hoop suspended in the air in an energetic feat of acrobatics.

Retired acts
 Volants (Scarabs): Using two trapezes on either side of the stage, the scarabs are thrown onto a platform suspended above the centre of the stage, where they are caught and thrown in a banquine-style discipline. This act was replaced by aerial cradle during the arena conversion in 2015.
 Spanish web duo (Butterflies): Two butterflies swing and twist on a long vertical rope. This act was replaced by aerial straps during the arena conversion in 2015.
 Acrosport (Fleas): A group of five male and female fleas use acrobatic gymnastic (acrosport) techniques to toss other fleas in the air as well as create high towers of fleas. This act was replaced by aerial straps during the arena conversion in 2015.

Costumes

The costumes in Ovo were designed by Liz Vandal and evoke the appearance of insects. The outfits were created to have areas that appear as sections to replicate the segmented bodies of insects. This was achieved by using permanent pleating, varying finishes, and coloring methods. To also provide the illusion of exoskeletons, a mixture of fabrics was used to create both hard and soft flexible fabrics, thus providing the look of a hard shell without inhibiting the artists' movements.

The crickets have detachable legs, which are removed for the powertrack act, to give the sense of an insect with six legs. The legs also provide the illusion that the cricket is oversized, aiding the spectator's illusion of being the size of an insect in this world.

Due to the rigidity of some of the costumes, most characters have two versions: the first is more lightweight and functional for their acrobatic performance. The second, on the other hand, is more richly detailed and heavier, and worn while not performing their act.

Music
The show's musical influences stem primarily from Brazilian genres such as samba; both the creator and music director are Brazilian. Additional texture is added by the use of sounds of insects throughout the soundtrack.
Below is a list of the tracks featured on the CD, which was released on April 13, 2010.

 Brisa Do Mar (Pre-show and opening)
 Foreigner (Cricket dance)
 Ants (Foot juggling and Icarian games)
 Cocoon (Tissue)
 Frevo Zumbido (Diabolos)
 Orvalho (Hand balancing)
 Carimbo da Creatura (Creatura)
 Love Duet Spanish web duo (2009–2015)
 Duo straps (2016-present)
 Scarabee Volants (2009–2015)
 Russian cradle (2016–present)
 Sexy Web (Web)
 Legs (Interlude into Wall)
 Flea Girls  Acrosport (2009-2015)
 Acro trio (2016–present)
 Super Hero (Slackwire)
 Secret Samba Luv (Clown act)
 Parede (Wall)
 Banquete (Banquet and bows)

Vocalists
 Marie-Claude Marchand – From April 23, 2009 (Montreal) to June 27, 2014 (Tokyo)
 Alexandra Cabanilla – From June 28, 2014 (Tokyo) to June 7, 2015 (Sendai)
 Júlia Tázie – From April 8, 2016 (Lake Charles) to Jan 20, 2019 (Murcia)
 Lari Finocchiaro''' – From March 7, 2019 (Belo Horizonte)

TourOvo'' started touring in April 2009 in Montréal, Canada. They performed their 1,000th show on January 29, 2012, while in Santa Monica, California.

References

Cirque du Soleil touring shows
Insects in popular culture